David Williams  (3 October 1841 – 20 November 1929) was the Archdeacon of Cardigan from 1903 until 1928.

Williams was educated at Llandovery College and Jesus College, Oxford; and ordained in 1867. After a curacy in Carmarthen he was Rector of Merthyr, Carmarthenshire from 1868 to 1887; Rural Dean of Carmarthen from 1885 to 1887; Prebendary of St David's Cathedral from 1886 to 1903; and Vicar of Holy Trinity, Aberystwyth  from 1887 to 1928.

References

1841 births
1929 deaths
People educated at Llandovery College
Alumni of Jesus College, Oxford
Archdeacons of Cardigan